Birkir Ívar Guðmundsson was a goalkeeper for the Iceland men's national handball team. He is married to Kristín Ólafsdóttir and has two daughters with her. He is currently playing for Haukar in Iceland.

References

Living people
Birkir Ivar Gudmundsson
Year of birth missing (living people)
Place of birth missing (living people)